Mohammadabad (also Romanized as Moḩammadābād) is a village in Rudbar Rural District, in the Central District of Tafresh County, Markazi Province, Iran. At the 2006 census, its population was 81, in 22 families.

References 

Populated places in Tafresh County